Acanthosaura tongbiguanensis is a species of agama found in China.

References

tongbiguanensis
Reptiles of China
Reptiles described in 2019